Mind Transplant is the third album by American jazz drummer Alphonse Mouzon recorded in 1974 and released on the Blue Note label.

Reception
The AllMusic review by Robert Taylor awarded the album 4½ stars stating "Raw and powerful, the music herein is what made fusion such a viable musical style... Easily one of the best fusion recordings of all time".

Track listing
All compositions by Alphonse Mouzon
 "Mind Transplant" - 4:05 
 "Snow Bound" - 3:05 
 "Carbon Dioxide" - 4:38 
 "Ascorbic Acid" - 3:26 
 "Happiness Is Loving You" - 4:09 
 "Some of the Things People Do" - 3:40 
 "Golden Rainbows" - 6:56 
 "Nitroglycerin" - 3:04
Recorded at Wally Heider Sound Studio III in Los Angeles, California on December 4 (tracks 2, 5 & 7), December 5 (track 6), December 6 (tracks 3 & 8) and December 9 & 10 (tracks 1 & 3), 1974

Personnel
Alphonse Mouzon  - drums, vocals, synthesizer, electric piano, organ, arranger, conductor
Jerry Peters - electric piano, organ
Tommy Bolin, Lee Ritenour - guitar
Jay Graydon - guitar, voice bag on "Snow Bound", programming
Henry Davis - electric bass

Produced by Skip Drinkwater
Arranged  By Alphonse Mouzon

References

Blue Note Records albums
Alphonse Mouzon albums
1975 albums